OffBeat is a New Orleans, Louisiana monthly local music magazine founded by Jan V. Ramsey in 1987. The magazine, published by OffBeat, Inc., focuses on the popular music of New Orleans and Louisiana, which is generally R&B, blues, jazz, rock, hip-hop, funk, and many other traditional styles of music popular in Louisiana. OffBeat was the first magazine in New Orleans to resume publishing after the devastation of Hurricane Katrina, despite losing all its staff and its printer.

OffBeat publishes several music festival oriented issues, including the "French Quarter Festival Souvenir Guide" in early April, and the "Jazz Fest Bible," a special Jazz Fest issue. These issues contain schedules of local music festivals, detailed information on performers and club listings, and interviews with local musicians. The magazine hosts a local music awards series, "The Best of the Beat Awards", to highlight local music and musicians, and also runs the "Louisiana Music Directory," containing listings of bands, musicians, record labels, and clubs in the state.

The magazine's website was the first magazine website online in the state of Louisiana.

OffBeat is featured in the HBO series Treme. Its editorial resulted in the creation of characters (such as "DJ Davis McAlary", in reality local musician/DJ/writer Davis Rogan), and storylines in the series.

References

External links
 Official Website

1987 establishments in Louisiana
Music magazines published in the United States
Monthly magazines published in the United States
Jazz magazines
Magazines established in 1987
Magazines published in Louisiana
Mass media in New Orleans
Music of New Orleans
Music of Louisiana